The Walls of Thessaloniki (Teíchi tis Thessaloníkis) are the 4 kilometer-long city walls surrounding the city of Thessaloniki during the Middle Ages and until the late 19th century, when large parts of the walls, including the entire seaward section, were demolished as part of the Ottoman authorities' restructuring of Thessaloniki's urban fabric. The city was fortified from its establishment in the late 4th century BC, but the present walls date from the early Byzantine period, ca. 390, and incorporate parts of an earlier, late 3rd-century wall. The walls consist of the typical late Roman mixed construction of ashlar masonry alternating with bands of brick. The northern part of the walls adjoins the acropolis of the city, which formed a separate fortified enceinte, and within it lies another citadel, the Heptapyrgion, popularly known by the Ottoman translation of the name, .

In 1988, as part of the Paleochristian and Byzantine monuments of Thessaloniki, the walls were added to the UNESCO World Heritage List because of their outstanding Byzantine architecture.

Gallery

References

Sources

External links

Buildings and structures completed in the 4th century
Byzantine fortifications in Greece
Byzantine architecture in Thessaloniki
Thessaloniki
World Heritage Sites in Greece
History of Thessaloniki
Tourist attractions in Thessaloniki
Roman fortifications in Greece